Emmy is a 1934 Hungarian comedy film directed by Steve Sekely and starring Gábor Rajnay, Irén Ágay and Ella Gombaszögi. It is based on a novel by Viktor Rákosi.

Cast
 Gábor Rajnay - Maleczky ezredes 
 Irén Ágay - Emmy 
 Ella Gombaszögi - Melitta, társalkodónö 
 Pál Jávor - Korponay László 
 Antal Páger - Pálóczy 
 Mici Erdélyi - Tapsika, szubrett 
 Gyula Kabos - Sztringai Jakab 
 Karola Zala - Váthyné 
 Blanka Szombathelyi - Böske 
 László Keleti - Benkovics önkéntes 
 György Kerekes - Petri önkéntes 
 Imre Apáthi - Pozdorjai önkéntes 
 László Dezsõffy - Õrmester 
 Zoltán Makláry - Csárdás 
 Gyula Gózon - Markos

External links

1934 films
Hungarian comedy films
1930s Hungarian-language films
Films directed by Steve Sekely
Films based on Hungarian novels
1934 comedy films
Hungarian black-and-white films